Love Sex Aur Dhokha (also known by the initialism LSD) is a 2010 Indian Hindi-language anthology found footage drama film directed by Dibakar Banerjee and written by Banerjee and Kanu Behl. Jointly produced by Ekta Kapoor, Shobha Kapoor and Priya Sreedharan under the banner of ALT Entertainment, the film stars mostly newcomers including Anshuman Jha, Nushrat Bharucha, Rajkummar Rao, Neha Chauhan, Amit Sial, Herry Tangri and Ashish Sharma. It has three separate but interlinked stories about an honour killing, an MMS scandal and sting operations.

Banerjee conceived the film after he came across several video clips containing sexual content including the DPS MMS clip and wanted to explore what led to that situation. He then wrote two short stories, which he later expanded into three. The film was made entirely using digital formats with different cameras, including a handycam, an amateur film camera, a security camera, an underwater camera and spy cameras. Nikos Andritsakis served as the film's cinematographer and Namrata Rao was its editor. The film's music was composed by Sneha Khanwalkar and the lyrics were written by Banerjee.

Love Sex Aur Dhokha was screened at the 2010 London Indian Film Festival and the Munich International Film Festival. It was released in India on 19 March 2010 to positive reviews from critics. Rao and Pritam Das won the Best Editing and the Best Sound Design Award, respectively, at the 56th Filmfare Awards. Khanwalkar received the R. D. Burman Music Award.

Plot

Love (Titled Superhit Pyaar) 
Rahul, a young amateur film director in his early 20s decides to make a small-budget film for the diploma of his film course. He conducts an audition and meets Shruti, a young girl whom he chooses for the leading role. Shruti belongs to an orthodox family and her father is a real estate magnate. The two bond and become closer, but Shruti's overprotective, aggressive brother overhears their telephone conversation and attacks the film set to find out the identity of the caller. Shruti tells Rahul her father will get her married to someone else; they elope and get married. From their honeymoon suite, they telephone Shruti's family and ask for their acceptance; her father and brother are initially angry but then approve and tell them they will be sending a car to pick them up from the hotel. During the journey, Rahul and Shruti are ambushed by Shruti's brother and his goons who murder them, dismember their bodies with an ax and bury their remains.

Sex (Titled Paap ki Dukkaan) 
Shruti's friend Rashmi is a quiet woman who works night shifts in a supermarket to support her family.  Adarsh, a supermarket supervisor, has obtained his job by using his family connections with the store's owner and has debts with loan sharks. He makes a pact with a friend to make a sex tape with one of the employees to sell to the media for a large sum of money; Adarsh chooses Rashmi, for whom he develops genuine feelings. He decides to back out of the plan but his feelings for Rashmi are suppressed by his greed. Rashmi receives news about the gruesome deaths of Shruti and Rahul and is deeply saddened. Taking advantage of Rashmi's vulnerability, Adarsh has sex with her and captures it on the shop's security camera. Having sold the footage, Adarsh is able to pay off his debts. It is later revealed that Rashmi was fired from the supermarket and shunned by her family.

Dhokha (Titled Badnaam Shohorat) 
Prabhat, an investigative reporter, is desperate for a sensational story so he will be paid a bonus by the news company that employs him. He saves the life of aspiring dancer Naina, who tries to commit suicide by jumping from a bridge. Naina is initially furious at Prabhat but plans a sting operation with him to take revenge on Loki Local, a music producer and singer who asked her to trade sex for the position of a leading dancer in his upcoming music video. Prabhat and Naina take the sting footage to the media, who encourage them to plan another sting; Naina will supposedly blackmail Loki by threatening to reveal the initial footage in an attempt to catch him trying to bribe her—to render false any accusations by Loki of fabrication of footage. Naina meets Loki in the supermarket where Rashmi works to execute the sting, while Prabhat watches closely. The plan goes awry when Loki tries to steal the camera and shoots Prabhat, who is admitted to the hospital. Naina goes to meet Prabhat to hand over the footage so he can get the bonus, but he decides to protect Naina's dignity, refuses to give his superiors the footage and resigns. It is revealed that Naina has betrayed Prabhat by accepting the role as the lead dancer in Loki's new music video.

Cast 

 Anshuman Jha as Rahul
 Nushrat Bharucha as Shruti
 Sandeep Bose as Shruti's Dad
 Rajkummar Rao as Adarsh
 Neha Chauhan as Rashmi
 Arya Banerjee as Naina
 Herry Tangri as Loki Local
 Amit Sial as Prabhat
 Atul Mongia as Atul
 Ashish Sharma as Shahid
 Taran Bajaj as Goldie
 Aaditi Pohankar

Production

Development 

Director Dibakar Banerjee said several real-life sex scandals, including the DPS MMS scandal, inspired him to make Love Sex Aur Dhokha because he "wanted to do something on what led to that incident". He co-wrote two short stories with Kanu Behl, which they later expanded into three. According to Banerjee, he found some sex tapes "hilarious" because "those people, while having sex were also struggling with the camera, the ergonomics of how to shoot while having sex". He wrote a two-page story about a man who is in love and "the contrast between what he thinks love should be and what it actually is". The film consisted of three stories dealt with issues of honour killings, sexual exploitation and voyeurism. The second story is based on diploma film footage that Banerjee had retrieved. He said the three stories were connected; "the way we played with time, and cause and effect and the fundamental rule that every story has a beginning, a middle and an end".

Banerjee approached Ekta Kapoor after they finished writing the script; he said Kapoor "readily agreed" to produce it. In 2010, Kapoor launched ALT Entertainment and decided to release Love Sex Aur Dhokha under her banner. The film was jointly produced by Balaji Motion Pictures's ALT Entertainment and Priya Sreedharan. In June 2009, it was announced that Banerjee would make an experimental film about the impact of digital technology for Kapoor's company. Banerjee said, "Earlier, we would have sex because we wanted to have sex. Today, we have sex to get caught on a tape, to further their career or to make friends. That is the issue that the film is examining." Banerjee stated that he wanted to examine "voyeurism", which "the whole society finds itself trapped in", through the film. Banerjee was inspired by the Tehelka sting operations for the third story of his film, which is about a sting operation on a pop star. According to him, several clichéd dialogues of Hindi cinema were used in the film to show a "mirror" because the "trajectory is very similar to a typical Bollywood film and yet very different".

Casting 
Banerjee and his team decided to cast newcomers and unknown professional actors. The cast consisted of actors including Neha Chauhan, Rajkummar Rao, Anshuman Jha, Nushrat Bharucha and Amit Sial. The casting director of the film was Atul Mongia, who also acted in it. Neha Chauhan was cast after Banerjee saw her in her brother's wedding video; Chauhan wanted to assist Banerjee but he chose her for the role of Rashmi. Mongia auditioned 15 people a day for three and a half months to cast the 75 characters in the film. He screened almost 2,000 actors and auditioned 1,000 of them; some actors were chosen from the street. Sandeep Bose, who runs a casting agency, sent actors for auditions and was eventually cast in the role of Shruti's father in the first story. The three actors who were shortlisted for lead characters underwent through a two-month workshop in Prithvi Theatre. They were asked to act out random situations and improvise scenes. Arya Banerjee, daughter of sitar player Nikhil Banerjee, was cast in the role of model Naina. Herry Tangri was cast in the role of pop star Loki local. Rajkummar Rao, an alumnus of Film and Television Institute of India, was cast as Adarsh; to resemble his character's physique he had to lose  in a month. The film was edited by Namrata Rao, who also acted in a small role.

Filming 
Love Sex aur Dhokha is the first Indian film to be shot in the digital format. It was made using guerrilla film-making techniques in locations in Mumbai by the director of photography Nikos Andritsakis. It was filmed with different cameras, including a handycam, an amateur film camera, night-vision cameras, a security camera, an underwater camera and a spy camera. The stories are told from the camera's point of view; Banerjee said, "It is almost as if the camera is a character and to do that you have to give the camera character". The film was made with different kinds of camera. Banerjee said he chose to work digitally to get the aesthetics that he could not get on 35 mm film. An item song titled "I Can't Hold It" was purposely filmed poorly because in the film, the song is being shot by an amateur film director who makes mistakes.

Banerjee said many takes were required for the five-second shot in which a woman jumps into the sea because "the camera jumped along with her, filming her movements". Andritsakis wanted to give the film a "video look" that has a "harsh" picture quality with everything in the frame in focus. Banerjee wanted the film to look "shaky, low-tech, fuzzy and unframed", and yet make it entertaining. He showed 1 Night in Paris to Andritsakis for reference. The underwater sequences set in a canal were filmed separately in a swimming pool with special gears for the camera. The suicide scene was filmed using a stunt double and the camera free-flowing in air; the actors performed their parts of the scene separately using chroma key.

Soundtrack 

The film's soundtrack album was composed by Sneha Khanwalkar and the lyrics were written by Dibakar Banerjee. The album rights were acquired by Sony Music and the soundtrack album was released on 8 March 2010. Vocals were performed by Khanwalkar, Kailash Kher, Nihira Joshi, Amey Date and Nagarjuna. Khanwalker was hired before the script was ready.

Harmeet Singh of The Indian Express called the album a "pure delight" with a "rustic-club feel to it". The song "I Can't Hold It" has a blend of Rajasthani folk music with dholaks playing in the background. Sampurna Wire wrote: "Overall, though Love Sex Aur Dhokha doesn't cover a distance similar to that of Oye Lucky! Lucky Oye!, it has a much bigger single in the form of the title track "Love Sex Aur Dhokha" which makes all the difference".

Release 
A 90-second trailer was to be released along with 3 Idiots in theatres across India; it was edited three times so it could be shown in 290 multiplex screens. The film was promoted with the tagline, "You're being watched". A promotional video of the film's title song was launched prior to the release. It was screened at the 2010 London Indian Film Festival and the Munich International Film festival. The Central Board of Film Certification shortened and blurred a love scene showing a bare-backed woman on top of a man. Banerjee showed his disappointment and said: "Those who saw the complete sex scene with the naked body were traumatised. There was nothing sexual about it". A reference to caste in the love story between a low-caste man and a high-caste woman was also changed; Banerjee stated his disappointment, saying, "This completely changes the perspective of my story since now the caste-challenged love story is turned into a poor-boy-rich-girl romance". The lyrics of the track "Tu Nangi Achi Lagti Hai" were changed to "Tu Gandi Achi Lagti Hai" in the film. Love Sex Aur Dhokha received an "A (adult only)" certificate after the changes. Kapoor was in a "state of shock" after seeing the final cut of the film because the shaky camerawork and the stories affected her deeply.

Before the film's release, Banerjee screened the first 20 minutes of it in the SIES Nerul college and discussed it with the students. The film was released in 350 screens in India. It was only released in India because the producers felt the recovery of costs for small-budget films is not possible overseas. After the film's release, the producers decided to release it in selected screens in the US, UK, UAE and some other international markets. A photograph showing the bare backs of two actors from the film was released before the film; some media outlets labelled it "the most shocking scene to be ever filmed in a commercial Hindi film". Banerjee reacted to this and said, "I want the scene to be judged as part of the film. To use the picture out of context will be damaging to the film." The film is also available on Netflix.

Reception

Critical reception 

Love Sex Aur Dhokha opened to mostly positive responses from critics. Rajeev Masand gave it 4 out of 5, stating it as "the most riveting Hindi film in recent memory" and called it "possibly the most important Hindi film since Satya and Dil Chahta Hai." Raja Sen called the film a "masterpiece", writing, "Bollywood has just grown up the only way it could, with Love, Sex and Dhokha." Sarita Tanwar of Mid-Day called it "season's best film" and a "must-watch". A review carried by The Indian Express called the film "path-breaking" which "signifies the changing face of Hindi cinema". Anupama Chopra called the film "a grim, deeply unsettling and yet compelling portrait of urban India" and a "polarizing film".

Sanjukta Sharma of Mint gave a positive review and said, "LSD is raw and courageous; it is not pretty, but it has beauty ...". A review in The Times of India gave three-and-a-half to the film and stated, "Don't expect time-pass entertainment. Think beyond run-of-the-mill and see how Ekta Kapoor re-invents herself as the producer of contemporary Indian cinema's first full-blown experimental film". Mayank Shekhar stated, "Where any Bollywood movie without a gyrating, lip-synching hero perceives itself as 'different', this one ... is truly an experiment". Namrata Joshi called the film "remarkable" for the way it creates an "audacious narrative".

Baradwaj Rangan wrote, "Love Sex Aur Dhokha is nothing if not off-the-charts ambitious—and yet, I couldn't shake off the feeling that Banerjee has pulled off a successful experiment rather than a satisfying experience". Aniruddha Guha of Daily News and Analysis said the writing of the film was "inconsistent" and called it "bold but not so beautiful". Subhash K. Jha said. "the director vision is so unified to the way the characters see themselves that a section of the audience may feel it's watching a hugely self-indulgent work that wants to keep the 'cinema' out of cinema". Ajit Duara of OPEN compared the film's title and filming techniques with Steven Soderbergh's Sex, Lies, and Videotape and felt unlike Soderbergh's film, Banerjee's film doesnot show his point of view.

The film was mentioned in critic and author Shubhra Gupta's book, 50 Films That Changed Bollywood, 1995–2015.

Box office 
It opened well at multiplexes in metro cities, in Delhi and North India. The film grossed  by the end of its theatrical run, making it a profitable venture.

Awards 
Namrata Rao and Pritam Das won the Best Editing and the Best Sound Design Award awards respectively at the 56th Filmfare Awards. Sneha Khanwalkar received the R. D. Burman Music Award. The film received the Best Film Award, while Banerjee received the Best Director Award at the 2011 Stardust Awards in the searchlight category.

See also 
 Found footage (pseudo-documentary)
 Anthology film

References

External links 
 
 

2010 films
2010s Hindi-language films
2010s erotic drama films
Balaji Motion Pictures films
Camcorder films
Films directed by Dibakar Banerjee
Films scored by Sneha Khanwalkar
Found footage films
Indian anthology films
Indian avant-garde and experimental films
Indian erotic drama films
2010s avant-garde and experimental films
2010 drama films